St. Benedict Immaculate Canadian Academy (also known as St. BICA Academy or St. Benedict) is a private, Christian coeducational school offering preschool, primary and secondary education. It is located in the Rukpokwu neighborhood of Port Harcourt, Rivers State, and was established in 2008.

The initial intake of St. Benedict when it started was less than twenty students. However, it has continued to expand with number of students running into hundreds. In spite of this, the school promotes personalized learning through small class sizes. Its secondary section has facilities for both day and boarding programmes.

Curriculum
St. Benedict follows a Canadian based curriculum combined with features from the British and the Nigerian models, concurrently in pursuit of the fulfillment of its visions which include educating the student for global citizenship.

See also
List of schools in Port Harcourt

References

External links

Schools in Port Harcourt
Educational institutions established in 2008
Secondary schools in Rivers State
2008 establishments in Nigeria
2000s establishments in Rivers State
Primary schools in Rivers State
Christian schools in Nigeria